Granville Township is located in Putnam County, Illinois. As of the 2010 census, its population was 2,934 and it contained 1,318 housing units.

History
Granville Township is named after Granville, Massachusetts.

Geography

Demographics

References

External links
City-data.com
Illinois State Archives

Townships in Putnam County, Illinois
1855 establishments in Illinois
Townships in Illinois